The Chartered Governance Institute (previously known as The Institute of Chartered Secretaries and Administrators, ICSA) has divisions in Australia, Canada, Hong Kong/China, Malaysia, New Zealand, Singapore, Southern Africa, the United Kingdom and Zimbabwe.

The division based in London, is known as The Chartered Governance Institute UK & Ireland. It represents and supports members in the United Kingdom, Republic of Ireland, Crown Dependencies and associated territories, which include the Caribbean, sub-Saharan Africa, the Middle East, Mauritius and Sri Lanka. The Chief Executive is Sara Drake. It has 32 branches and special interest groups, including the Chartered Secretaries Professional Practice Group, the Association of Women Chartered Secretaries and the CGI Registrars Group, and affiliations with organisations like the Worshipful Company of Chartered Secretaries and Administrators. The Chartered Governance Institute is a member of the CBI, ECoDA, the Professional Associations Research Network (PARN) and a founder member of The Next Generation NED Network.

The Chartered Governance Institute is the qualifying and membership body for governance professionals and, both globally and through the divisions, provides professional development, guidance and thought leadership, and works with regulators and policymakers to champion high standards of governance across all sectors.

History 
The institute, which has a Royal Charter purpose of leading ‘effective and efficient governance and administration of commerce, industry and public affairs’, has over 125 years’ of experience in educating and supporting governance professionals. Thomas Brown founded the London-based Institute of Secretaries in 1891 to represent the interests of corporation secretaries who had emerged to govern the administration of joint stock companies following the introduction of limited liability in 1855. The royal charter was granted in 1902. In 1970, the Institute of Secretaries merged with the Corporation of Secretaries becoming the Institute of Chartered Secretaries and Administrators (ICSA) in 1971. To demonstrate the broadening of the professional support it provides to all those in governance roles name was changed to The Chartered Governance Institute when the royal charter was amended in September 2019.

Profile 
The Chartered Governance Institute independently advocates for reform in governance and provides thought-leadership and guidance to the public, private and not-for-profit sectors. The Institute qualifies chartered secretaries and chartered governance professionals and also offers public and in-house training for governance professionals across different sectors, as well as bespoke training for boards. The divisions of the Institute publish magazines and resources to keep practitioners up to date with the latest in law, regulation and procedure, including industry-leading guidance, research and specialist publications. Likewise, they run conferences for those working in corporate governance, charity governance, sports governance and academy governance. It also offers board performance and governance reviews and holds annual awards.

Education 
The Chartered Governance Institute provides internationally recognised qualifications in governance and awards post-nominals. The post-nominals awarded for chartered membership are Fellow (FCG/FCIS) and Associate (ACG/ACIS). For professional and part-qualified membership, the post-nominal is CG (Affiliated). Graduate members are able to use the post-nominal GradCG or GradICSA. See List of post-nominal letters (United Kingdom).

The Chartered Governance Qualifying Programme (CGQP) is the institute's flagship qualification and the most common route to graduate status and chartered membership of the institute. A person who has successfully completed the CGQP, and satisfied the prescribed working experience requirement is eligible for election as an associate or fellow of the institute. Associates and fellows are entitled to use the designation "Chartered Secretary" or "Chartered Governance Professional" or both, depending on the modules they have completed as part of the CGQP. "Chartered Secretary" and the postnominal "ACIS" are listed in the  European Union (Recognition of Professional Qualifications) Regulations 2015, schedule 1, part 2 (Professions Regulated by Professional Bodies Incorporated by Royal Charter), thus making chartered secretaries a regulated profession. Both Chartered Secretary and Chartered Governance Professional are designations approved by the Privy Council of the United Kingdom.

The division based in London also offers a Foundation Programme, which provides a broad introduction to business, governance, administration, compliance and company law, and validated postgraduate courses, and short course qualifications in international finance and administration, corporate governance, charity governance, education governance, sports governance and health service governance. Holders of these qualifications are eligible for Affiliated membership. Other courses and qualifications are provided across all the divisions. Memoranda of Understanding are in place with The Institute of Company Secretaries of India (ICSI) and The Institute of Chartered Secretaries and Administrators of Nigeria (ICSAN).

Charities Act 2011
The Chartered Governance Institute is one of eleven professional bodies whose members are allowed by the Charities Act 2011 in the UK to conduct independent examination of charities whose gross income exceeds £250,000 but is not otherwise subject to statutory audit.

See also 
 Chartered Secretaries New Zealand
 Governance Institute of Australia

References

Company secretaries
Organisations based in the London Borough of Camden
Chartered Secretaries and Administrators